Iran participated in the 2007 Asian Indoor Games held in Macau, China from October 26, 2007 to November 3, 2007.

Competitors

Medal summary

Medal table

Note: Demonstration sports indicated in italics.

Medalists

Results by event

Aerobic gymnastics

Men

Open

Board games

Chess

Men

Women

Mixed

Bowling

Men

Cue sports

Men

Esports

Open

Finswimming

Men

Futsal

Men

Women

Indoor athletics

Men

Women

Indoor hockey

Men

Kabaddi

Men

Muaythai

Men

Roller sports

Roller freestyle
Open

Skateboarding
Open

Sepak takraw

Men

Short course swimming

Men

Sport climbing

Men

Women

Demonstration sports

3x3 basketball

Men

Kurash

Men

Women

References

External links
 2007 Asian Indoor Games official website
 Iran Olympic Committee - Asian Indoor Games Medalists

Nations at the 2007 Asian Indoor Games
Asian Indoor Games
2007